Giuseppe Pontiggia (25 September 1934 – 27 June 2003) was an Italian writer and literary critic.

Biography
He was born in Como, and moved to Milan with his family in 1948. In 1959 he graduated from the Università Cattolica in Milan with a thesis on Italo Svevo. After a first unnoticed short story anthology published in 1959, Pontiggia, encouraged by Elio Vittorini, decided to devote himself entirely to writing starting from 1961.

His first novel was L'arte della fuga of 1968. Pontiggia won the Premio Strega in 1989 with La grande sera and the Premio Campiello in 2001 with Nati due volte. He also wrote numerous articles and essays.

He died in Milan in 2003 by a circulatory stroke. He was an atheist.

Bibliography

Essays
 Il giardino delle Esperidi (1984)
 Le sabbie immobili (1991)
 L'isola volante (1996)
 I contemporanei del futuro (1998)

Novels and short story anthologies
 La morte in banca (1959)
 L'arte della fuga (1968;  1990 revised)
 Il giocatore invisibile (1978)
 Il raggio d'ombra (1983)
 La grande sera (1989)
 Vite di uomini non illustri (1994)
 Nati due volte (2000)
 Prima persona (2002)
 Il residence delle ombre cinesi (2003, posthumous)

References

External links
 Browse Pontiggia library catalogue  kept by Biblioteca europea di informazione e cultura.

1934 births
2003 deaths
People from Como
Italian atheists
Italian literary critics
Italian male non-fiction writers
Strega Prize winners
Premio Campiello winners